Gjoko Taneski (born 2 March 1977) is a Macedonian singer.

Taneski was born in Ohrid, SR Macedonia, SFR Yugoslavia. He won the National final for the Eurovision Song Contest 2010, after which he represent Macedonia with the song "Jas ja imam silata" at Eurovision Song Contest 2010.

Eurovision 2010
On 20 February 2010, Taneski won the Macedonian national final and represented North Macedonia in the Eurovision Song Contest 2010 with the song "Jas ja imam silata", performing it in the first semi-final held on 25 May 2010 in Oslo, Norway. It failed to qualify for the final and finished on the 15th place in the semi final with 37 points.

Discography

Albums
Zbogum Najmila (Farewell Dearest) (2007)
Nikogaš Dosta (Never Enough) (2009).

References

About Gjoko Taneski at Eurovision Song Contest

Eurovision Song Contest entrants of 2010
1977 births
Living people
Eurovision Song Contest entrants for North Macedonia
21st-century Macedonian male singers
Macedonian rock singers
Macedonian pop singers
People from Ohrid